Jeff Judah is an American film and television producer and writer. Along with his writing/producing partner Gabe Sachs, Judah serves as creator and executive producer of the NBC medical drama series The Night Shift. The two also created ABC's teen drama series Life As We Know It. Judah also worked as a producer on the remake of 90210,  and wrote the screenplay for the film Diary of a Wimpy Kid, released on March 19, 2010.

On July 17, 2001, both Sachs and Judah through their Sachs/Judah Productions company had signed a deal with Studios USA.

Filmography

Film

Television 
The numbers in directing and writing credits refer to the number of episodes.

Acting credits

References

External links
 

American television directors
American television producers
American television writers
American male television writers
American web producers
Living people
Place of birth missing (living people)
Year of birth missing (living people)